The 1984–85 IHF Women's Cup Winners' Cup was the ninth edition of IHF's competition for European women's handball national cup champions. 23 teams entered the competition, three more than the previous edition, but two of them withdrew.

Like in the previous season, the final confronted a Yugoslav and a Czechoslovak team, and Budućnost Titograd defeated Druzstevník Topolniky to clinch a fourth consecutive Cup Winners' Cup for Yugoslavia. It was their first European title and the first of their three trophies in this competition to date as of 2013. Defending champion Dalma Split was knocked out by semifinals Kuban Krasnodar in the Round of 16.

Results

Winner 
Budućnost Titograd, winner of the Cup Winners' Cup, was composed of:

 Mirjana Mugoša
 Katica Janković
 Ljiljana Mugoša
 Nataša Tomašević
 Stanka Mugoša-Božović
 Dragana Pešić
 Olga Pejović
 Mirsada Ganić
 Suzana Ganić
 Svetlana Mugoša
 Maja Bulatović
 Zorica Pavićević
 Željka Ratković
 Vesna Lekić
 Tanja Raonić

References

Women's EHF Cup Winners' Cup
1984 in handball
1985 in handball